John McGahon (born 20 November 1990) is an Irish Fine Gael politician who has been a senator for the Cultural and Educational Panel since April 2020.

Early life and career
McGahon is from Dundalk, County Louth, and attended Dundalk Grammar School. He obtained a BA in history and politics from University College Dublin. His father, Johnny McGahon, was a member of Dundalk town council from 1994 to 2004. His uncle Brendan McGahon was a TD for Louth from 1982 to 2002.

Louth County Council
John McGahon was first elected to Louth County Council for the Dundalk–Carlingford local electoral area in 2014, retaining his seat in 2019. He was elected as chairperson of the Dundalk Municipal District on two separate occasions, 2017–2018 and 2019–2020. He stood unsuccessfully in the Louth constituency in the 2020 general election.

Seanad Éireann
On 31 March 2020, McGahon was elected to Senate following the 2020 election to the upper house. In June 2020, he was appointed as the Fine Gael senate spokesperson on climate action and is on the joint Oireachtas committee on climate action and the committee on the implementation of the Good Friday Agreement.

Assault allegation
While awaiting trial for an alleged assault in his home town of Dundalk, dating to June 2018, McGahon was asked by Fine Gael not to stand in the 2020 general election but ran anyway. In an interview with LMFM in October 2018, he admitted that he had been involved in a fight and that he had a long-standing problem with alcohol.

On 24 May 2022, McGahon went on trial, accused of assault. On 27 May 2022, he was found not guilty

References

External links
John McGahon's page on the Fine Gael website

Members of the 26th Seanad
Fine Gael senators
1990 births
Living people
Local councillors in County Louth
People from Dundalk
Alumni of University College Dublin
People educated at Dundalk Grammar School